Emelie Garbers (née Jonsson; born 1 September, 1982) is a Swedish actress. 

Her role as the Mimarobe in the 2018 science fiction film Aniara garnered her a Guldbagge Award for Best Actress in a Leading Role at the 55th Guldbagge Awards in January 2020. Other film credits include the 2012 television movie Call Girl.  Her television credits include the drama Dejta on Sveriges Television.

Garbers was educated at the Royal Swedish Ballet School and the Stockholm University of the Arts.

References

External links
 
 Emilie Garbers on Swedish Film Database

Swedish actresses
1982 births
Living people
Best Actress Guldbagge Award winners